At least three ships of the Royal Navy have been named HMS Strenuous :

  was a  sold in 1814.
  was an  launched in 1918 and scrapped in 1932.
  was a Catherine-class minesweeper of World War II.

References

Royal Navy ship names